FC Energiya Chaykovsky is a Russian football team from Chaykovsky. It played professionally from 1992 to 2002. Its best result was fourth place in the Russian Second Division (Zone Center in 1997 and Zone Ural in 1998). Since 2009, it plays in the lower level amateur league.

References

Association football clubs established in 1992
Football clubs in Russia
Sport in Perm Krai
1992 establishments in Russia